Fletcher Mountain is a high mountain summit in the Tenmile Range of the Rocky Mountains of North America.

Mountain

See also

List of Colorado mountain ranges
List of Colorado mountain summits
List of Colorado fourteeners
List of Colorado 4000 meter prominent summits
List of the most prominent summits of Colorado
List of Colorado county high points

References

External links

Mountains of Colorado
Mountains of Summit County, Colorado
Arapaho National Forest
North American 4000 m summits